Parmotrema gardneri is a species of foliose lichen in the family Parmeliaceae. It was first formally described in 1955 by Carroll William Dodge as Parmelia gardneri, from specimens collected in Brazil. Emmanuël Sérusiaux transferred it to the genus Parmotrema in 1984. In addition to South America, it is also found in Africa, Asia, and North America.

See also
List of Parmotrema species

References

gardneri
Lichen species
Lichens of Africa
Lichens of Asia
Lichens of North America
Lichens of South America
Lichens described in 1955
Taxa named by Carroll William Dodge